Andrena aliciae, the yellow-faced miner bee, is a species of miner bee in the family Andrenidae. It is native to North America.

References

aliciae